Liverpool Interlomas is a branch of the Liverpool department store chain in the Paseo Interlomas shopping mall, in the Interlomas neighborhood of Huixquilucan, Greater Mexico City.  The structure was designed by Rojkind Arquitectos. The building also houses a 16-screen Cinepolis cinema, an ice rink, 12 restaurants and a food court with 180 vendors.

The building gained the nickname "El OVNI" (the UFO) for its shape.

Design and construction
Rojkind Arquitects designed the building from July to December, 2010, and  the building was constructed from March to October 2011. The above-ground three stories are clad in a double-layered stainless steel surface fabricated by Zahner. The 30,000m2 department store includes a rooftop recreational park where friends, families, and pets are welcome.  Several design firms were involved in various aspects of the project. The interiors were done by Cincinnati-based FRCH Design Worldwide, the rooftop garden by Thomas Balsley and the gourmet space by JHP Design.

References

Department stores of Mexico
Shopping malls in Greater Mexico City